A list of all windmills and windmill sites which lie in the current Ceremonial county of  Essex.

Locations

A

B

C

D

E

F

G

H

I, K

L

M

N

O, P

Q, R

S

T

U, W

Locations formerly within Essex
For windmills in Barking, Cranham, Dagenham, East Ham, Havering, Leyton, North Ockendon, Rainham, Romford, Upminster, Walthamstow, West Ham and Woodford see List of windmills in London.
For windmills in Ickleton see List of windmills in Cambridgeshire.
For windmills in Kedington see List of windmills in Suffolk.

Maps
1676 Seller (map of Hertfordshire)
1678 John Ogilby  & William Morgan
1696 John Oliver
1700 Robert Morden & John Pask
1724 John Warburton, Joseph Bland & Payler Smith
1746 John Rocque
1749 Emanuel Bowen
1761 Thomas Kitchin
1757 Sparrow
1761 Kitchin
1776 John Andrews & Andrew Dury
1777 John Chapman & Peter André
1781 Carington Bowles
1799 J Woodward
1804 William Faden
1805 Ordnance Survey
1818 Christopher and John Greenwood (map of Middlesex)
1824 Christopher and John Greenwood
1840 Ordnance Survey
1844 Ordnance Survey
1893 Ordnance Survey
1903 Ordnance Survey

Notes
Unless otherwise stated, the source for all entries is the five volume Essex Windmills, Millers and Millwrights.

All mills are listed against the parish in which they were when built, which may not always be the parish with which they are most often associated. This affects-

Sach's Mill, Cressing – listed under Rivenhall
Billericay – listed under Great Burstead
Oxley Green Mill, Tolleshunt d'Arcy – listed under Tolleshunt
Virley Mill – listed under Tolleshunt
Messing Maypole Mill, Tiptree under Tolleshunt Knights

References

Windmills in Essex
Essex
Windmills